John Carver may refer to:

John Carver (Plymouth Colony governor) (bef. 1576–1621), passenger on the Pilgrim ship Mayflower
John Carver (board policy), author of a policy model for boards of directors
John Carver (footballer) (born 1965), English football manager
John Henry Carver (1926–2004), Australian physicist
John Carver (Archdeacon of Surrey) (1741–1814),
John A. Carver Jr. (born 1968), American attorney and politician

See also
John Carver Meadows Frost (1915–1979), British aircraft designer
Jonathan Carver (1710–1780), American explorer
Jack Carver, video game character